Asgeir Mickelson (born 30 September 1969) is a Norwegian musician, artist, photographer and music reviewer. Although primarily known as a drummer, he is also a skilled guitarist and bassist.

Biography
He has stated on his official message board that he started playing guitar roughly around 1982, and switched to drums in 1988-1989. He took two drum lessons in 1991, and is otherwise self-taught. He began playing guitar again in late 2002 and has stated on his forum that he has been recording solo thrash metal. He has also said that he is working on a doom metal album similar to the works of Candlemass. To this date he has only been employed as a drummer in all of the bands he is/has been a member of excluding Borknagar on their album Epic, where he played drums, bass, and performed the guitar on the track "The Weight of  Wind".

Mickelson has been a member of several metal bands, among which the best known ones are Spiral Architect which he co-founded, and Borknagar. He has also contributed session drums and live drumwork for several bands and artists, including Ihsahn's first solo album The Adversary and the albums Visions From The Spiral Generator and The Focusing Blur by Vintersorg. He most recently joined the Norwegian death metal band, Thornbound as drummer.

Aside from his work as a musician, Mickelson has worked as a writer for Scream Magazine in addition to his work as a graphic designer. Mickelson is the lead designer for Scream Magazine and the Inferno Metal Festival. He designed the artwork for The Trivial Act Mindscape album, the last three Borknagar albums, and is currently designing the artwork for Scariot's forthcoming full-length. He is a web designer as well and is currently working on a Norwegian drummer website entitled Blastbeat.no which will feature various drummers from the Extreme Metal world, including such men as Jan Axel Blomberg, Trym Torson, Frost, Tjodalv, Horgh, Bård Faust and himself.

He has until recently owned and run the Multimono recording studio in Norway, where he produced and engineered recordings, including the latest Scariot album. Additionally, such bands as Scariot, Twisted Into Form, Red Harvest, Solefald and Myoclon recorded on its premises. John Jacobsen of Sturmgeist also recorded his Gothenburg metal album with ENE there.

He arranges Scream Magazine's festival Screamfest and Norwegian Metal Awards.

Recently Asgeir quit Borknagar due to creative differences.
In May 2011 Asgeir joined Jens F Ryland in the band Artisan, and also began working on the Artisannorway website. A Metal Soapbox And Music project.

Outside of music, he is responsible for the release of a Norwegian poker magazine entitled, Norsk pokermagasin.

Discography

Borknagar
Quintessence (2000)
Empiricism (2001)
Epic (2004) (Drums and bass on entire album as well as select guitar parts)
Origin (2006)

Enslavement of Beauty
Session drummer Megalomania (2001)

Hardingrock
Session drummer Grimen (2007)

Highland Glory
Live session drummer (2003) playing 5 Iron Maiden cover songs

ICS Vortex
Storm Seeker Drums (2011)

Ihsahn
The Adversary (2006)
angL (2008)
After (2010)

Lunaris
Drummer (May 1999)
Session drummer Demo 2000 Demo (2000)
Session drummer Creative Destruction Demo (2000)
Session drummer The Infinite (2002)
Session drummer on the song "When It Ends" on Cyclic (2004)

Myoclon
Session drummer and producer. Forthcoming Full-Length

Sarke
 Oldarhian (2011)
 Aruagint (2013)

Scariot
 Momentum Shift (2007)

Spiral Architect
Spiral Architect Demo (1996)
A Sceptic's Universe (2000)

Sturmgeist
Live session drummer (2005). One week tour in Europe.

Testament
Live session drummer (2003). One gig in San Francisco and 2 week headlining tour in Europe (No Mercy festival)

Thornbound
Forthcoming Full-Length

Veil of Secrets
Dead Poetry Guitars, Bass, and Drums (2020)

Vintersorg
Visions From The Spiral Generator (2002)
The Focusing Blur (2004)

Notes

External links
 Asgeir Mickelson Official Homepage
 Artisan Norway - A Metal Soapbox and Music Project

1969 births
Living people
Norwegian audio engineers
Norwegian heavy metal bass guitarists
Norwegian male bass guitarists
Norwegian black metal musicians
Norwegian heavy metal drummers
Male drummers
Norwegian heavy metal guitarists
Norwegian multi-instrumentalists
Norwegian poker players
Norwegian record producers
Norwegian rock bass guitarists
Norwegian rock guitarists
Place of birth missing (living people)
Borknagar members